Tomáš Klobučník (born June 21, 1990 in Topoľčany) is a Slovak swimmer, who specializes in breaststroke events. He is a multiple-time Slovak swimming champion and record holder in the 100 and 200 m breaststroke, and also, a two-time Swimmer of the Year (2009 and 2011) by the Slovak Swimming Federation. Klobucnik is also a resident athlete for J&T Sport Team Bratislava, and is coached and trained by Gabriel Baran.

Klobucnik qualified for the men's 200 m breaststroke at the 2012 Summer Olympics in London, by breaking a long-course Slovak record, eclipsing the FINA B-cut time of 2:13.10 at the European Championships in Debrecen, Hungary. He challenged seven other swimmers in the second heat, including four-time OIympian Jakob Jóhann Sveinsson of Iceland. He raced to third place by less than 0.11 of a second behind Poland's Slawomir Kuczko in 2:13.40. Klobucnik failed to advance into the semifinals, as he placed twenty-third overall in the preliminaries.

At the 2016 Summer Olympics, he took part in the 100 m breaststroke but was unable to progress from the first round.

References

External links
 NBC Olympics Profile

1990 births
Living people
Slovak male swimmers
Olympic swimmers of Slovakia
Swimmers at the 2012 Summer Olympics
Swimmers at the 2016 Summer Olympics
Male breaststroke swimmers
Sportspeople from Topoľčany